The Saint Joseph Parish Complex is located at 1730 South 16th Street in South Omaha, Nebraska within the Roman Catholic Archdiocese of Omaha.

Description
Established in 1886, the congregation was founded "to serve Omaha's German-speaking Catholics." St. Joseph's continues with parishioners of German heritage comprising a large percentage of the church's membership.

The church was located in an area of German Catholics that was centered on South 16th Street and Center Street, and which was exclusive of Protestant Germans, who generally settled in a concentration centered on South 11th Street and Center Street where they built a German Methodist Episcopal Church in 1886.

The complex includes a church, a friary, a convent, and two school buildings. The friary, built in 1886, was planned by the same Brother who designed the convent and school in 1901. In 1928 a second school building was designed by Omaha architect Jacob Nachtigall.

See also
 Roman Catholic Archdiocese of Omaha
 List of churches in Omaha, Nebraska

References

 

Roman Catholic churches in Omaha, Nebraska
Convents in the United States
German-American culture in Omaha, Nebraska
Landmarks in South Omaha, Nebraska
History of South Omaha, Nebraska
National Register of Historic Places in Omaha, Nebraska
Churches on the National Register of Historic Places in Nebraska
1886 establishments in Nebraska
Roman Catholic churches completed in 1886
19th-century Roman Catholic church buildings in the United States